"giANTS" is a 1979 science fiction short story by Edward Bryant. It was first published in Analog Science Fiction.

Synopsis

An elderly scientist explains why he hates ants, and why he is participating in a secret government project to increase the size of invasive ants.  He explains that the "square-cube law" demands that an ever-increasingly size-mutated ant will at some point collapse under its own mass.  The square-cube law and forced mutation is used to thwart a South American giant ant invasion.

Reception
"giANTS" won the Nebula Award for Best Short Story of 1979, and was nominated for the 1980 Hugo Award for Best Short Story. Gary Westfahl has noted that the story is based on the fact that giant insects "would be unable to walk or sustain themselves".

References

Nebula Award for Best Short Story-winning works
1979 short stories
Fictional ants